Jachowski (feminine: Jachowska, plural: Jachowscy) is a Polish surname. Notable people with the surname include:

 Maciej Jachowski (born 1977), Polish actor and singer

See also
 11743 Jachowski (1999 JP130), a main-belt asteroid discovered on 1999

Polish-language surnames